Macit Özcan, (born 1954 in Karataş,  Adana Province, Turkey) is a Turkish politician of the Republican People's Party (CHP) and a former mayor of Mersin.

After his secondary education in Adana, he graduated in civil engineering from Çukurova University. He went on to work as a civil engineer in the Ministry of Public Works and Housing.
He has lived in Mersin since 1980.

He was elected Mayor of Mersin in 1999. He successfully stood for a third term in the March 2009 election. But in 2014  (partially because of the change in the election territory borders) he lost the elections. Özcan has been accused of being a "political octopus" and prone to corruption and dishonesty.

Committed to improving relations with his Arab neighbours, in 2006 Özcan launched a ferry service to the Syrian port of Latakia, which is one of Mersin's twin cities.

He is married with two children.

References

1954 births
Living people
Mayors of Mersin
Republican People's Party (Turkey) politicians
Çukurova University alumni